The crown prince of Saudi Arabia is the second-most important position in Saudi Arabia, second to the King, and is his designated successor. Currently, the Crown Prince assumes power with the approval of the Allegiance Council after he is nominated by the King. This system was introduced to the country during the reign of King Abdullah. In the absence of the King, an order is issued to have the Crown Prince manage the affairs of the state until the King's return.

History of the crown prince position
The last crown prince of the Second Saudi State was Abdulaziz, who lost the title when Abdul Rahman bin Faisal, his father, lost his state after the Rashidis conquered Riyadh in 1890. The Al Sauds went into exile and took refuge in multiple Arab states of the Persian Gulf for nearly a decade. After the defeat at the battle of Sarif in 1900, Abdul Rahman bin Faisal gave up all ambitions to recover his patrimony. Despite this, Abdulaziz and his relatives remained determined to regain Nejd. Throughout the early 1900s, the Al Sauds went on multiple raiding expeditions and wars of conquest to attempt to regain Nejd from the Rashidis. Their efforts were highly successful, and as a result, they successfully formed the third Saudi state. When Abdulaziz had taken enough land to become recognized as an Emir, he designated his eldest son Turki as his heir. When Turki died during the flu pandemic of 1919, Abdulaziz designated his second son Saud to be heir and further succession would be brother to brother. The Al Sauds went on to expand their borders out of Nejd and established multiple iterations of the third Saudi state. In 1932, after Abdulaziz administered the Nejd and Hejaz as two separate states, he unified them and formed Saudi Arabia. Abdulaziz declared himself king, and designated Saud, one of his sons, as crown prince.

When King Abdulaziz discussed succession before his death, he was seen to favor Prince Faisal as a possible successor over crown prince Saud due to Faisal's extensive knowledge from years of experience. Many years before, King Abdulaziz recognized Faisal as the most brilliant of his sons and gave him multiple responsibilities in war and diplomacy. "I only wish I had three Faisals", King Abdulaziz once said when discussing who would succeed him. However, King Abdulaziz made the decision to keep Prince Saud as crown prince. His last words to his two sons, the future King Saud and the next in line Prince Faisal, who were already battling each other, were "You are brothers, unite!" Shortly before his death, King Abdulaziz stated, "Verily, my children and my possessions are my enemies."

A fierce power struggle between Abdulaziz's most senior sons, Saud and Faisal, erupted immediately after Abdulaziz's death. Faisal was declared the Prime Minister of Saudi Arabia in 1954, but had limited powers. Soon after, Saudi Arabia began having financial issues and debt as a result of Saud's disastrous policies. Saud was often associated among other things with the plundering of oil revenues, luxurious palaces, and conspiracy inside and outside of Saudi Arabia while Faisal was associated with sobriety, piety, puritanism, thriftiness, and modernization. As the severity of the issues in Saudi Arabia became much worse, the House of Saud forced King Saud to delegate most of his executive powers to Faisal in 1958. However, Faisal was still unable to use his powers as Saud continued to block them, which prompted Faisal to resign. As Saud continued to handle general affairs ineptly, he was bringing Saudi Arabia to the brink of collapse. On 4 March 1964, Faisal and his brothers launched a bloodless coup d'état against Saud. Faisal was made regent, and Saud remained King as a purely ceremonial role. In November, the ulema, cabinet and senior members of the ruling family forced Saud to abdicate altogether, and Faisal became king in his own right. On 6 January 1965, Saud went to the palace with his uncle Abdullah bin Abdul Rahman to declare his allegiance to King Faisal.

The next in line, Prince Mohammed, was crown prince for a short time but disclaimed that title in favour of Prince Khalid in 1965.

Shortly after King Faisal was assassinated by his nephew, Khalid became the King of Saudi Arabia and Fahd became the crown prince. During Khalid and Fahd's reigns, both adopted conservative Islamic policies after the 1979 Grand Mosque seizure. When King Fahd had a stroke in 1995, crown prince Abdullah became the formal Regent for the remainder of Fahd's reign. When Abdullah became King, he began to modernize Saudi Arabia. He allowed women the right to vote and to work in government positions. Abdullah also created the Allegiance Council, a body that is composed of the sons and grandsons of Saudi Arabia's founder, King Abdulaziz, to vote by a secret ballot to choose future kings and crown princes.

As the nation became a gerontocracy in the 2000s and early 2010s, three crown princes died of old age in rapid succession. In the meantime, more and more princes were passed over. In January 2015, King Abdulaziz's last son, Muqrin, became crown prince, only to be ousted three months later in favour of his nephew, Mohammed bin Nayef. Mohammed bin Nayef, the first grandson of King Abdulaziz to hold the title, was himself removed in June 2017 by Mohammad bin Salman, another grandson of King Abdulaziz.

Crown Princes of Saudi Arabia (1933–present)

History of the second deputy prime minister position
The honorific title of "Second Deputy Prime Minister" goes back to 1967, in order to designate who was the senior prince not excluded from the throne. The position was created by King Faisal.
 
In March 1965, under pressure from King Faisal and the House of Saud, crown prince Mohammed stepped down as apparent to the Saudi throne. Mohammed was known to have temper issues and drinking problems. As a result, King Faisal installed Prince Khalid as crown prince. However, he was reluctant to accept the offer of King Faisal to be named crown prince several times until March 1965. In addition, Khalid asked King Faisal to remove him from the position various times. One of the speculations about Prince Khalid's selection as heir designate was his lack of predilection for politics. In short, by selecting him as heir designate the royal family could create an intra-familial consensus. In 1967, crown prince Khalid expressed his desire not to preside over the Council of Ministers against King Faisal's request which led to the appointment of Prince Fahd as second deputy prime minister with the task of leading the Council meetings. Prince Saad and Prince Nasir, who were older than Fahd, were set aside from the throne due to being less experienced.

When King Faisal was assassinated in 1975, King Khalid designated Prince Fahd as crown prince and Prince Abdullah as second deputy prime minister.

As King Khalid became ill with old age, the question of who would succeed Abdullah as the second deputy prime minister became more pressing. King Faisal was succeeded by King Abdullah, followed by King Fahd as de facto Deputy Prime Ministers of The Kingdom.

Second Deputy Prime Ministers of Saudi Arabia (1967–2011)

History of the deputy crown prince position

The honorific title of "Deputy Crown Prince" dates back from 2014. The position was created by King Abdullah. Muqrin bin Abdul'aziz Al Saud was the first prince to hold the deputy crown prince position. Since 21 June 2017, the post of deputy crown prince has been vacant. Till this day, no man who has served as Deputy Crown Prince has ever become King.

Deputy Crown Princes of Saudi Arabia (2014–2017)

Royal Standard

The Royal Flag of the crown prince consists of a green flag, with an Arabic inscription and a sword featured in white, and with the national emblem embroidered in silver threads in the lower right canton.

The script on the flag is written in the Thuluth script. It is the shahada or Islamic declaration of faith:

 
 
There is no other god but Allah, Muhammad is the messenger of Allah.

See also
Succession to the Saudi Arabian throne

References

Saudi Arabia
Kings of Saudi Arabia
Saudi Arabia